BK Saturnus is a Swedish football club located in Tyresö.

Background
BK Saturnus currently plays in Division 4 Stockholm Södra which is the sixth tier of Swedish football. They play their home matches at the Trollbäckens IP in Tyresö.

The club is affiliated to Stockholms Fotbollförbund.

Season to season

Footnotes

External links
 BK Saturnus – Official website

Football clubs in Stockholm